New Revolutionary Alternative (NRA) is an anarchist organization devoted to insurrectionary struggle in Russia.

The NRA set off bombs in Moscow military offices (Ostankino in 1996 and Cheryomushkinsky in 1997). In 1998 and 1999, NRA members orchestrated explosions at the Federal Security Service (FSB) Lubyanka Building. Four activists were found guilty: Nadezhda Raks, Olga Nevskaya, Larisa Romanova, and Tatiana Nekhorosheva-Sokolova. Romanova's sentence was later reduced. Alexander Biryukov was declared incompetent to stand trial and was sent to a psychiatric hospital.

See also
Black Guards
Chernoe Znamia
Narodnaya Volya

References 

Anarchist militant groups
Anarchist organizations in Russia
Terrorism in Russia